Hisakawa (written: 久川) is a Japanese surname. Notable people with the surname include:

, Japanese voice actress and singer
, Japanese wheelchair fencer

Fictional Characters
, a character from Anohana: The Flower We Saw That Day

Japanese-language surnames